The Angolan Basketball Cup is an annual basketball competition in which all Angolan basketball clubs are eligible to contest. The tournament, played in a knock-out system, is Angola's second most important basketball competition following the national league.

Angola Basketball Cup Finals (Men)

Angola Basketball Cup Winners (Men)

Angola Basketball Cup Finals (Women)

Angola Basketball Cup Winners (Women)

See also
 BAI Basket
 Angola Super Cup
 Federação Angolana de Basquetebol

References

 
Basketball cup competitions in Angola
1985 establishments in Angola